Chenar Sukhteh (also Romanized as Chenār Sūkhteh) is a village in Khvajehei Rural District, Meymand District, Firuzabad County, Fars Province, Iran. At the 2006 census, its population was 105, in 22 families.

References 

Populated places in Firuzabad County